A deadly tornado outbreak devastated parts of Louisiana and Tennessee on February 11–13, 1950. The outbreak covered about a day and a half and produced numerous tornadoes, mostly from East Texas to the lower Mississippi Valley, with activity concentrated in Texas and Louisiana. Most of the deaths occurred in Louisiana and Tennessee, where tornadoes killed 28 and nine people, respectively. Several long-lived tornado families struck the Red River region of northwestern Louisiana, especially the Shreveport–Bossier City area. One of the tornadoes attained violent intensity, F4, on the Fujita scale and caused 18 deaths, including six at the Shreveport Holding and Reconsignment Depot near Barksdale Air Force Base. It remains one of the top ten deadliest tornadoes on record in the state of Louisiana, in eighth place.

Also in Louisiana, two other destructive tornadoes on parallel paths killed five each. Five additional deaths occurred across the border in East Texas. Nine people died in a tornado in western Tennessee as well. In all, official data indicate that the entire outbreak killed 45 people and left about 200 injured, though tornado researcher Thomas P. Grazulis counted 42 deaths in a reanalysis published in 1993. The number of confirmed tornadoes, 19, is likely an underestimate, given the lack of NEXRAD and sparse storm spotting in the early 1950s. Also, several long-tracked tornadoes recorded in the outbreak likely contained more, shorter-lived tornadoes. Reports indicate that at least seven other tornadoes may have occurred, potentially bringing the number of tornadoes to at least 26, and the actual total was likely higher.

Confirmed tornadoes

February 11 event

February 12 event

February 13 event

Other tornadoes
Besides the officially documented tornadoes, several other events were identified as tornadoes by Grazulis in his 1993 documentation. The official Climatological Data National Summary of February 1950 also identified one tornado that, like the others listed below, does not appear in the archives of the Storm Prediction Center. They are as follows.
Anderson County, Texas (Montalba) – Possible F2 tornado leveled a farmhouse and several barns, dispersing their contents for up to a mile. Listed by Grazulis.
Camp, Titus, and Morris counties, Texas (east of Pine to Omaha) – Possible F2 tornado flattened a couple of homes near Pine, with two injuries. Losses were $70,000 from the tornado in Omaha, where the tornado leveled several homes and a gymnasium at a school. Listed by Grazulis.
Falls County, Texas (Baileyville) – Possible F2 tornado flattened as many as ten homes, with five injuries. Listed by Grazulis.
Harrison County, Texas (Gill) – Possible F2 tornado wrecked four homes, with 10 injuries. Listed by Grazulis.
Polk and Angelina counties, Texas (south of Lufkin to south of Huntington) – Possible F2 tornado struck two rural communities, sweeping away one home and strewing the debris for acres. A father and his two children died, and three other people sustained injuries, including the mother of the children. Listed by Grazulis.
Nacogdoches County, Texas (Chireno area) – Possible F2 tornado wrecked six homes, with two injuries. Listed by Grazulis.
Jefferson County, Texas (Lovell Lake/LaBelle area) – Possible tornado with one injury. Listed by the Climatological Data National Summary.

See also
 List of tornadoes striking downtown areas
 List of North American tornadoes and tornado outbreaks
 List of F4 and EF4 tornadoes

Notes

References

F
Tornadoes in Tennessee
Tornadoes in Louisiana
February 1950 events in the United States
1950 natural disasters in the United States